DXKX (91.5 FM), broadcasting as 91.5 Brigada News FM, is a radio station owned by Primax Broadcasting Network and operated by Brigada Mass Media Corporation. The station's studio is located at the 3rd Floor, Gabucan Bldg., Ulas, Brgy. Talomo, Davao City, and its transmitter is located along Broadcast Ave., Shrine Hills, Matina, Davao City.

History

1995–2013: K91/City Lite/Smooth FM
The station was established in 1995 as K91. It had an Adult Top 40 format. In 1998, it became an affiliate of Raven Broadcasting Corporation in Manila and rebranded as City Lite 91.5 with a smooth jazz format. In early 2000, after it ended its affiliation with RBC, it rebranded as Smooth FM 91.5. It went off the air sometime in 2013.

2015–present: Brigada News FM
In early 2015, Brigada Mass Media Corporation took over the station's operations and became part of the Brigada News FM network. The station's old transmitter was replaced with a new 10,000 watt transmitter bought from Quark Electronics of Italy. Regular programming was first aired on August 10, 2015. In time for the 30th Kadayawan Festival, on August 23, 2015, Brigada News FM was formally launched. Then Davao City Mayor (now Vice President) Inday Sara Duterte, Brigada Group of Companies President Elmer Catulpos, and other Brigada officials were present in the occasion.

References

External links
Brigada News Davao

Radio stations in Davao City
Radio stations established in 1995
News and talk radio stations in the Philippines